The Venerable Richard Pilkington D.D was an Anglican priest in England. 

Pilkington was educated at Emmanuel College, Cambridge, where he graduated B.A. in 1590, and Queen's College, Oxford. He held livings at Hambleden and Salkeld. He was Archdeacon of Leicester from 1625 until his death in 1631. He married Ann May, daughter of John May.

Notes 

1631 deaths
Alumni of The Queen's College, Oxford
Archdeacons of Leicester
17th-century English Anglican priests
Alumni of Emmanuel College, Cambridge